NAPE-PLD may refer to:
 N-acyl phosphatidylethanolamine-specific phospholipase D, an enzyme
 N-acetylphosphatidylethanolamine-hydrolysing phospholipase D, an enzyme